Picazo is a Spanish surname. Notable people with the surname include:

Ángel Picazo (1917–1998), Spanish actor
Miguel Picazo (1927–2016), Spanish film director, screenwriter and actor

See also
El Picazo, a municipality in Cuenca, Castile-La Mancha, Spain

Spanish-language surnames